Siân Rebecca Berry (born 9 July 1974) is a British politician who served as Co-Leader of the Green Party of England and Wales alongside Jonathan Bartley from 2018 to 2021, and as its sole leader from July to October 2021. From 2006 to 2007, she was one of the Green Party's principal speakers.

She was unsuccessful as the party's candidate in the 2008 London mayoral election, the 2016 election, and the 2021 election. Berry has been a Member of the  London Assembly (AM) for Londonwide since 2016, and is also a Green Party councillor on Camden Council, representing Highgate.

Early life and career
Siân Rebecca Berry was born on 9 July 1974, and brought up in Cheltenham, Gloucestershire, England. She was educated at Pate's Grammar School, a state grammar school in Cheltenham, where her parents were teachers. She studied metallurgy and the science of materials at Trinity College, Oxford, graduating with a Master of Engineering (MEng) degree. Upon graduating in 1997, she moved to London.

Green Party politician 
Berry joined the Green Party aged 27 when working as a medical copywriter for large pharmaceutical companies, which she decided conflicted with her principles. She became increasingly politically active, beginning a new career in an ethical temping agency that dealt with a wide range of charitable organisations.

In her first major party political role as the Green Party Campaigns Co-ordinator, Berry led the Green Energy Works Campaign, calling for low carbon, non-nuclear energy to tackle climate change. She also led a campaign against the renewal of Britain's nuclear weapon, the Trident submarine, travelling to the nuclear submarine base in Faslane, Scotland, to protest.

Berry failed to be elected to Camden London Borough Council three times: once during 2002 and twice in 2006. In the 2002 local elections, she came fifth in the Highgate ward with 811 votes, 38 votes behind the third place required to gain a seat. The 2006 local elections saw her contest the neighbouring Kentish Town ward, in which she gained 1,057 votes and came sixth out of 12. A 7 December 2006 by-election in Kentish Town ward saw her come second out of four with 812 votes, behind the Liberal Democrat winner on 1,093 votes.

In 2005, Berry was the Green Party's parliamentary candidate for the Hampstead and Highgate constituency (which included Highgate ward) at that year's general election. She received 5.3% of the vote, coming fourth; the seat was held by Labour's Glenda Jackson.

Berry was elected as the Green Party's female Principal Speaker unopposed in autumn 2006, succeeding Caroline Lucas MEP and, working alongside male Principal Speaker Derek Wall, served until autumn 2007, when Lucas resumed the post following an election. She wrote a regular blog for the New Statesman magazine from November 2006 to July 2008.

On 12 March 2007, the Green Party announced that Berry would be the party's candidate in the 2008 London mayoral election, after she received 45% of the votes in the London Green Party's internal election. Berry recommended that her voters back Labour Party candidate Ken Livingstone as their second preference and Livingstone advocated an equivalent preference for his supporters. Berry was endorsed by The Independent and The Observer newspapers, with Ken Livingstone as second preference. Berry came fourth, with 3.15% of first preferences and 13.50% of second preferences. This was the highest placing for a Green Mayoral candidate at the time, later surpassed by the Green's Jenny Jones in the 2012 London mayoral elections who came third ahead of the Liberal Democrats.

In the 2014 local elections, Berry was elected to the Highgate ward of Camden London Borough Council, holding the seat of outgoing Green councillor Maya De Souza in a split result for the ward. On 2 September, it was announced that she had won the internal party election to stand as the Greens' London mayoral candidate and first place list candidate for the London Assembly elections in 2016. She was one of the few candidates in the race to rent rather than own her home and made private renters' rights a centrepiece of her campaign. She was described by The Guardians London specialist Dave Hill as having "like her party, grown more formidable with experience".

Berry came third in the first preference voting round for the mayoralty, and thus did not make it to the second round. However, she was elected to the London Assembly as one of two Green members.

At the 2017 general election, Berry ran as the Green candidate for Holborn and St Pancras, which includes her Highgate ward. She finished fourth, and the party lost its deposit in the seat, which was retained for Labour by Sir Keir Starmer.

At the May 2021 London Assembly elections, delayed by a year owing to the COVID-19 pandemic, Berry was re-elected. The same month, alongside celebrities and other public figures, Berry was a signatory to an open letter from Stylist magazine which called on the government to address what it described as an "epidemic of male violence" by funding an "ongoing, high-profile, expert-informed awareness campaign on men’s violence against women and girls".

On 14 July 2021, Berry announced she would stand down as the Green Party's co-leader, citing an internal party conflict over transgender rights and stating that "there is now an inconsistency between the sincere promise to fight for trans rights and inclusion in my work and the message sent by the party’s choice of frontbench representatives." This then set in motion the 2021 Green Party of England and Wales leadership election.

Non-party activism

Berry was a founder of the Alliance against Urban 4×4s, which began in Camden in 2003 and became a national campaign demanding measures to stop 4×4s (or sport utility vehicles) "taking over our cities". The campaign is known for its "theatrical demonstrations" and mock parking tickets, credited to Berry (although now adapted by numerous local groups), some 150,000 of which have been placed on 4×4 vehicles by campaigners. The group was successful in getting the Mayor of London, Ken Livingstone, to adopt one of its founding principles when he introduced a higher congestion charge for vehicles with high emissions. The Alliance campaigns further for greater taxes and stricter controls on advertisements for 4×4s. An international '4×4 Network' has now been founded.

In her local borough of Camden, Berry has also campaigned against the Iraq war, genetically modified foods and air quality problems, and supported local services threatened by redevelopment projects. She has advocated "green development" in Kings Cross Railwaylands (the largest brownfield site in the UK) to provide more family-housing.

She initiated the Census Alert campaign to stop Lockheed Martin from running the UK Census, and is a Patron of the Fair Pay Network.

In 2009 she was a driving force behind the Reheat Britain campaign for 'boiler scrappage' which secured funding to replace some of the most inefficient boilers in the UK through the 2009 annual Pre Budget Report.

Berry is a humanist and a patron of Humanists UK (formerly the British Humanist Association), a UK charity representing non-religious people who want a secular state. On 15 September 2010, Berry, along with 54 other public figures, signed a BHA open letter published in The Guardian, stating their opposition to Pope Benedict XVI's state visit to the UK.

From June 2011 to late 2015, Berry worked as a roads and sustainable transport campaigner for the charity Campaign for Better Transport.

Police monitoring
In April 2016, it was reported that Berry had been monitored by the National Domestic Extremism and Disorder Intelligence Unit, in apparent contradiction of assurances by Sir Bernard Hogan-Howe, the Commissioner of the Metropolitan Police, that the unit would not target peaceful campaigners.

Author
Berry is also author of a number of books, including 50 Ways to Greener Travel, 50 Ways to be a Greener Shopper, 50 Ways to Save Water and Energy and 50 Ways to make your house and garden greener. In 2010 she published Mend it! and in 2011 Junk for Joy on upcycling projects.

References

External links

 Official website
 Green Candidate for London Mayor and Assembly in 2016 Official website
 Biography on the Green Party website
 Sian Berry's blog at the New Statesman
 Alliance Against Urban 4x4s

1974 births
21st-century British non-fiction writers
21st-century English women writers
Alumni of Trinity College, Oxford
Councillors in the London Borough of Camden
English environmentalists
English humanists
Green Party Members of the London Assembly
Green Party of England and Wales councillors
Green Party of England and Wales parliamentary candidates
Living people
People educated at Pate's Grammar School
People from Cheltenham
Sustainable transport pioneers
Women councillors in England
Leaders of political parties in the United Kingdom